Soniadi is a village in Kamrup rural district, situated in south bank of river Brahmaputra.

Transport
The village is located south of National Highway 37, connected to nearby towns and cities with regular buses and other modes of transportation.

See also
 Uzankuri
 Sarthebari

References

Villages in Kamrup district